The New Mal–Changrabandha–New Cooch Behar line are a set of 2 lines which connect , a border transit point near Indo-Bangladesh border in Cooch Behar district with the stations of New Mal in Jalpaiguri district and New Cooch Behar in Cooch Behar district of West Bengal. It is under the jurisdiction of Northeast Frontier Railway. The Malbazar– section of the line was a metre-gauge line, before its gauge conversion began on 2002. The Malbazar–Changrabandha section was re-opened to public on 20 January 2016 after gauge conversion. The New Changrabandha–New Cooch Behar broad-gauge line was built as an extension as a part of the New Maynaguri–Jogighopa rail line to provide an alternate link from North Bengal to Assam and was opened to public on 21 February 2016.

Railway Stations

History

Bengal Dooars Railway
The Bengal Dooars Railway company built several metre-gauge lines in the area. It started its main line to open up the Western Dooars and for the development of the tea industry in the region. The main line extended from the then Barnes Ghat (near present-day Maynaguri Road station) in the eastern bank of the Teesta River to Dam Dim via Mal Junction and was opened for service on 15 January 1893.

The Lataguri–Ramshai branch line was opened to serve the Ramshai tea garden near the western bank of the Jaldhaka river on 11 June 1893.

The main line was further extended south, first from Barnes Junction to Baura (20 April 1900) and then from Baura to Bhotmari (21 October 1900) and finally from Bhotmari it was connected to Lalmonirhat junction of the Eastern Bengal Railway on 20 November 1900.

On 1941 Bengal Dooars railway was amalgamated with Eastern Bengal Railway which was further merged with Assam Bengal Railway to form Bengal & Assam Railway on 1942. They remained the operators until partition of India in 1947.

Post-Partition

The rest of the line from  till Lalmonirhat junction fell on the East Pakistan side.

Metre-gauge services continued from Siliguri junction to  till gauge conversion of the New Jalpaiguri–Alipurduar–Samuktala Road line isolated the Malbazar–Changrabandha section as the only MG line in the area.

Gauge conversion

The line was thrown open to public on 20 January 2016 and a new passenger train was started between Siliguri Jn and Changrabandha. The old MG branch line towards Ramshai was not converted and was dismantled.

New Assam link

To provide a 3rd new link between North Bengal & Assam, the  New Maynaguri–Jogighopa line project was included in the railway budget of 2000–01. The work on the line was divided into the following sections:

  long New Mal– section (Gauge conversion completed and opened for service on 20 January 2016)
 /–Maynaguri Road–Jalpaiguri Road Y connection (Jalpaiguri Road–Maynaguri Road section is completed. Work is under progress on New Maynaguri/New Domohani–Maynaguri Road section as of August 2018)
  long New Changrabandha–New Cooch Behar new line (work completed & opened for service on 21 February 2016)
  long New Cooch Behar– new line (work completed & opened for service on 11 February 2012)
  long Fakiragram– branch line gauge conversion including the line between Golokganj & Gauripur (Opened for service on 13 September 2010)
  long Gauripur–Abhayapuri (Jogighopa) new line (Line from Gauripur till Alamganj is completed. Rest is work under progress as of August 2018).

References

5 ft 6 in gauge railways in India
Alipurduar railway division
Rail transport in West Bengal